Dolores Marco Gómez  (born 29 August 1973) is a badminton player from Spain.

Career
Marco played at the 1991, 1995, 1997, 1999 and 2001 World Badminton Championships.

National Championships
Marco is the most successful player ever in the Spanish National Badminton Championships, with 24 titles, 9 of them in women's singles, 9 in women's doubles and 6 in mixed doubles.

References

External links 
 Tournament results

Spanish female badminton players
Living people
1973 births
20th-century Spanish women